Beyond The Valley (commonly known as BTV) is a multi-day music festival held annually at Gippsland Parklands in Lardner, Victoria, Australia over the New Year's Eve period. It has previously taken place at Phillip Island Circuit, Phillip Island and Lardner Park, Warragul.

History
In 2019 the festival launched a fundraiser campaign to support those affected by the 2018-2019 Australian bushfire season. Later that year, organisers received site management related criticism amid extreme weather conditions during the event. The festival's official website stated that the 2020 event won't take place between 28 Dec and 01 Jan 2021 and director Nicholas Greco has commented that it is being placed on hiatus caused by the COVID-19 pandemic. He has also admitted however, that the business has come to a "complete standstill" due to the circumstances.

Timeline

2014

2015

2016

2017

2018

2019

References

External links 
 Official website

Festivals in Victoria (Australia)
Electronic music festivals in Australia
Festivals